Arthur Rolland Kelly (1878–1959) was an American architect, primarily in the Los Angeles, California area.  Arthur designed approximately five hundred homes and other buildings.

Biography

Early life
Born of Irish parents, who emigrated from Dublin in approximately 1876, he was born in Waterloo, Iowa. After studying architecture at the University of Illinois under Nathan Clifford Ricker, he graduated in 1902 with a B.S. in architecture.  After touring Europe to study the architecture there for three months, he then settled in Los Angeles in 1902.

Career
Among his first jobs was working for the architectural firm of Greene and Greene in Pasadena. Within a few years, he opened his own architectural firm, initially creating homes in various styles in Hollywood and surrounding areas. In the book California Design 1910 author Robert Winter states "The majority of his residential work during the Craftsman period leans toward Colonial Revival and is of only marginal interest. Winter goes on to note one exception, the ca. 1909 John T. Allen ranch house, Hollywood.

William Arthur Newbery was Kelly's first associate. Among his first large commissions was the Huntington Beach High School in 1908.  The Newbery association lasted only a few years. Independently,  he earned his largest commission to date, the United Verde Copper Company buildings in Jerome, Arizona.  Among these buildings were worker's homes, a doctor's home, a church, hospital, hotel, school and apartments.  Another important building during this period was Hollywood's first luxury hotel, The Christie Hotel on Hollywood Boulevard.

The 1920s saw a very prolific period in Kelly's career.  His specialization was in homes of Spanish Colonial Revival style and Tudor Revival style.  Most of his clients chose to have his designs built on lots they had purchased in Holmby Hills, Beverly Hills and San Marino, California. Kelly's associate during this period was Joe Estep.  A few of Kelly's many designs included the William S. Hart Ranch in Newhall, the Arthur Letts Jr. estate in Holmby Hills (now known as The Playboy Mansion), Beverly Hills estates for J. Crampton Anderson, John Blystone, Richard Dix, Johnny Mack Brown, and many others.  During this period, Kelly also designed all the buildings for the Westlake School for Girls (now known as Harvard-Westlake School) in Bel-Air and the Wilshire Country Club in Hancock Park.

The period of the 1930s to the early 1950s saw Kelly in association with his son, architect Joseph Rolland Kelly.

Other than the Letts/Playboy Mansion, which actor Peter O'Toole described as "What God would have done if He'd had the money", Kelly's most published work is his 1911 Frost-Tufts house, Hollywood. This residence, having undergone a detailed restoration  has been featured in several books and magazines.

Personal life
He was married to Enid Harrod Kelly.

See also

Some selected sketches of Arthur Kelly's residential and commercial designs from the 1920's:

ArthurKelly.org (this is not a link so please type it out in your browser)

References

Architects from California
American residential architects
1878 births
1959 deaths
People from Waterloo, Iowa